Elaea or Elaia was the ancient name for a promontory of Cyprus, near the ancient city of Knidos. The cape lies within the territory of the Turkish Republic of Northern Cyprus.

References
 Hazlitt, Classical Gazetteer, "Elaea"

Landforms of Northern Cyprus